Segment polarity protein dishevelled homolog DVL-1 is a protein that in humans is encoded by the DVL1 gene.

Function 

DVL1, the human homolog of the Drosophila dishevelled gene (dsh) encodes a cytoplasmic phosphoprotein that regulates cell proliferation, acting as a transducer molecule for developmental processes, including segmentation and neuroblast specification. DVL1 is a candidate gene for processes involved in cell transformations involved in neuroblastoma. The Schwartz-Jampel syndrome and Charcot-Marie-Tooth disease type 2A have been mapped to the same region as DVL1. The phenotypes of these diseases may be consistent with defects which might be expected from aberrant expression of a DVL gene during development. Three transcript variants encoding three different isoforms have been found for this gene.

Interactions 

DVL1 has been shown to interact with:
 AXIN1, 
 DVL3, 
 EPS8,  and
 Mothers against decapentaplegic homolog 3.

See also 
 Dishevelled

References

Further reading

External links 
 DVL1 on the Atlas of Genetics and Oncology